The 20 September 2013 Iraq attacks were a series of coordinated bombings and shootings across central and southern parts of Iraq that resulted in at least 25 people killed and dozens more injured. The biggest attack took place in Samarra, where a bomb hidden in the air-conditioning unit of a Sunni mosque was detonated, killing 18 and injuring 21 others.

Attacks

References

21st-century mass murder in Iraq
Bombings in the Iraqi insurgency
Mass murder in 2013
Murder in Iraq
Terrorist incidents in Iraq in 2013
Samarra
Building bombings in Iraq